Kenza Tazi (born 6 February 1996) is an American-born Moroccan alpine skier. She competed for Morocco at the 2014 Winter Olympics in the slalom and giant slalom.

Early life
Kenza Tazi was born on 6 February 1996 in Boston, Massachusetts. Tazi began to ski at the age of three, joining her first ski club when she turned 12. She later explained that "every year my family took me skiing for one week in winter and my love of the sport grew from there".

Skiing career
After competing in the international skiing circuit, Tazi ranked high enough to qualify for the 2014 Winter Olympics in Sochi, Russia. This followed her recovery from a cruciate ligament injury suffered a year prior at Ancelle. She is Moroccan, born in the US, with her talents she was selected to represent her country  Morocco at the 2014 Winter Olympics, alongside fellow skier Adam Lamhamedi.

Tazi admitted that she was not expecting to win medals, saying "I'll try to enjoy myself. I have neither the technique, nor the experience, to win a medal at this major sporting event, so I have different goals. I'm here primarily to ski and to improve my abilities." She placed 62nd overall in the women's giant slalom, and 45th in the slalom.

See also
Morocco at the 2014 Winter Olympics

References

1996 births
Living people
Citizens of Morocco through descent
Moroccan female alpine skiers
Olympic alpine skiers of Morocco
Alpine skiers at the 2014 Winter Olympics
Sportspeople from Boston
American female alpine skiers
American sportspeople of African descent
American people of Moroccan descent
21st-century American women